Stylianos Mavromichalis (1899 – 29 October 1981) was a Greek politician and prime minister.

Biography 
Born in Mani, Mavromichalis was a descendant of Petros Mavromichalis, who participated in the Greek War of Independence.

Mavromichalis studied law and was president of the Areopagus (court of cassation; Greek: Άρειος Πάγος), the Supreme Court of Greece. He was prime minister for a very short period, from 29 September to 8 November 1963, of a transitional government. He died in Athens on October 29, 1981.

References 

1899 births
1981 deaths
20th-century prime ministers of Greece
Maniots
Mavromichalis family
20th-century Greek judges
Presidents of the Supreme Civil and Criminal Court of Greece